Al Sharqiyah, Ash Sharqiyah (from Arabic ) or its variants, meaning 'eastern' or loosely 'oriental', may refer to:

Places

Ash Sharqiyah Region (Oman)
Ash Sharqiyah North Governorate
Ash Sharqiyah South Governorate
Ash Sharqiyah Province, Saudi Arabia
Ash Sharqiyah, Abyan, Yemen
Ash Sharqiyah, Hadhramaut, Yemen
Ash Sharqiya Fort, in the harbor of Old Muscat, Oman
Sharqia Governorate, Egypt
El Sharkia SC, a sports club
Al-Ain Region, Abu Dhabi, formerly Ash-Sharqiyyah Region
Kassala (state), Sudan, called Ash Sharqiyah 1991–1994)
Sharqiya Sands, Oman

See also
Al Gharbiyah (disambiguation) (western)
Ash Shamaliyah (disambiguation) (northern)
Al-Janubiyah (disambiguation) (southern)
Al Wusta (disambiguation) (central)
Eastern (disambiguation)
Sharq (disambiguation)
Axarquía, a comarca of Andalusia, Spain
Mashriq, the historical region of the Arab world to the east of Egypt 
Sharqliyya, Syria